2015 State Basketball League season may refer to:

2015 MSBL season, Men's SBL season
2015 WSBL season, Women's SBL season